Nuestra Belleza Guanajuato 2010, was held at the Auditorio Municipal Mariano Abasolo Dolores Hidalgo, Guanajuato, Mexico on July 23, 2010. At the conclusion of the final night of competition, Helena Baca of León was crowned the winner. Baca  was crowned by outgoing Nuestra Belleza Guanajuato titleholder, Clementina Velázquez. Ten contestants competed for the state title.

"Helena Baca" triumph was discussed for several reasons, among them that she is not from León but from Lagos de Moreno Jalisco

Results

Placements

Special awards

Judges
Rubí Valdez - Nuestra Belleza Guanajuato 2003
Fernanda Verdín - Nuestra Belleza Guanajuato 2005
Ofelia Correa - Regional Cordinnator of Nuestra Belleza México
Luis Mario Santoscoy - National Director of Televisa Spectacles.
Norma Verdín - Fashion Designer''

Background Music
Varana

Contestants

References

External links
Official Website

Nuestra Belleza México